In Māori mythology, as in other Polynesian traditions, Māui is a culture hero and a trickster, famous for his exploits and cleverness. He possessed superhuman strength, and was capable of shapeshifting into animals such as birds and worms.

He was born premature and cast into the ocean by his mother, where the waves formed him into a living baby. He was discovered by his grandfather and later went to live with his siblings. One day he followed his mother to the underworld where he met his father, Makeatutara, who baptised Māui incorrectly. As a punishment from the gods for this mishap, Māui and all of humanity were doomed to die.

His last trick, which led to his death, involved the goddess Hine-nui-te-pō. While attempting to win immortality for mankind, Māui entered her vagina, intent on leaving through her mouth while she slept. However, he was crushed by the teeth in her vagina, which were made of obsidian.

In myth, Māui constantly breaches tapu (ritual restrictions) and his name sounds like , meaning 'left-hand side', the side associated with tapu's opposite, noa.

Names and epithets 
Māui-tikitiki ("Māui the top-knot")
Māui-tikitiki-a-Taranga ("Māui the top-knot of Taranga")
Māui-tikitiki-o-Taranga (see above)
Māui-pōtiki ("Māui the last born")
Māui te whare kino ("Māui the house of trouble")

Legends 
The offspring of Tūmatauenga increased and multiplied and did not know death until the generation of Māui-tikitiki and his brothers.

Birth 
Māui is the son of Taranga, the wife of Makeatutara. Ocean spirits found and wrapped the child in seaweed and jellyfish. His grandfather Tama-nui-ki-te-Rangi then found the child on the beach, covered by swarms of flies and gulls, and nourished him to adolescence.

Discovery of his siblings 
When Māui became old enough, he travelled to his family's home and found his four brothers, Māui-taha, Māui-roto, Māui-pae, and Māui-waho, and his sister, Hina. The brothers are at first wary of the newcomer.

Later at night Māui came to his relatives while they were gathered in the marae, dancing and being merry. He crept in and sat down behind his brothers, and soon Taranga called the children and found a strange child, who at first she does not recognise and attempts to cast him from the house, but he proved to be her son. Māui was thus taken in as one of the family. Some of the brothers were jealous, but the eldest addressed the others as follows:

Quest to find his parents 

After Māui performed feats such as transforming himself into different kinds of birds, his brothers acknowledged his power and admired him. He became vexed that his mother always left before dawn and returned the next night, he one day blocked the entrances and sources of light into their house to keep her there, and stole her clothes. With the sun up, he was able to see where she went every day, and it turned out that she'd pull a clump of tussock from the ground, and descend a large tunnel to the underworld.

Once he arrived there he found a group of people sitting on a patch of grass in a grove of  trees, from which he dropped berries onto his parents' heads.

Upon Māui transforming back into a human, his mother recognised him as the child who used to live with her other sons. His father, Makeatutara, then took him to the water to give a baptism, but mistakenly rushed through it, which caused him to stress.

Māui slows the Sun 
In former days, the sun used to travel quickly across the sky, leaving not enough daylight time for working and eating. Māui proposed to catch the sun and slow it down. Armed with the jaw-bone of Murirangawhenua and a large amount of rope, which is in some tellings made from his sister Hina's hair, Māui and his brothers journeyed to the east and found the pit where the sun-god Tama-nui-te-rā slept during the night-time. There they tied the ropes into a noose around the pit and built a wall of clay to shelter behind. Tama-nui-te-rā was caught in the noose and Māui beat him severely with the jaw-bone until he surrendered and agreed to travel slowly across the sky.

Māui fishes up the North Island 
Māui's older brothers always refused to let him come fishing with them. Then he hid away in the hull of his brothers' waka (canoe). The next morning, when the waka was too far from land to return, he emerged from his hiding-place. His brothers would not lend him any bait, so he struck himself on the nose and baited the hook with his blood. Māui hauled a great fish, known as Hāhau-whenua, up from the depths. Thus the North Island of New Zealand is known as Te Ika-a-Māui (The Fish of Māui).

When it emerged from the water, Māui left to find a tohunga to perform the appropriate ceremonies and prayers, leaving his brothers in charge. They, however, did not wait for Māui to return but began to cut up the fish, which writhed in agony, causing it to break up into mountains, cliffs and valleys. If the brothers had listened to Māui, the island would have been a level plain, and people would have been able to travel with ease on its surface.

In Northern Māori traditions of New Zealand, Māui's waka became the South Island, with Banks Peninsula marking the place supporting his foot as he pulled up that extremely heavy fish. Besides the official name of Te Waipounamu, another Māori name for the South Island is Te Waka-a-Māui, the canoe of Māui. In southern traditions, the South Island is known instead as Te Waka o Aoraki and predates Māui's expedition. Māui sailed a canoe called Mahaanui and after he had pulled up the North Island (Te Ika a Maui) he left Mahaanui on top of a mountain in the foothills behind what is now Ashburton. That mountain now bears the name Mahaanui, and the coastline between Banks Peninsula and the Waitaki River is called Te tai o Mahaanui (the tides of Mahaanui).

Māui brings fire to the world 
Māui wanted to know where fire came from, so one night he went among the villages of his people and put all the fires out. Māui's mother Taranga, who was their , said that someone would have to ask Mahuika, the goddess of fire, for more. So Māui (a grandson of Mahuika) offered to go and find her. Mahuika lived in a cave in a burning mountain at the end of the earth. She gave Māui one of her burning fingernails to relight the fires, but Māui extinguished fingernail after fingernail until Mahuika became angry and sent fire to pursue Māui. Māui transformed himself into a hawk to escape, but to no avail, for Mahuika set both land and sea on fire. Māui prayed to his great ancestors Tāwhirimātea, god of weather, and Whaitiri-matakataka, goddess of thunder, who answered by pouring rain to extinguish the fire. Mahuika threw her last nail at Māui, but it missed him and flew into some trees including the māhoe and the kaikōmako. Māui brought back dry sticks of these trees to his village and showed his people how to rub the sticks together and make fire.

Irawaru, the first dog 
Māui went fishing with Irawaru, the husband of his sister Hina. During the expedition, he became annoyed with Irawaru; versions differ as to the cause. In some, Māui was jealous of Irawaru's success at fishing; in others, they disagreed when their fishing-lines became entangled; in still others, Māui was angry at Irawaru's refusal to give him a cloak, or disgusted at Irawaru's greedy nature. Whatever the provocation, when Māui and Irawaru returned to shore, Māui stretched out Irawaru's limbs and transformed him into the first dog. When Hina asked Māui if he had seen her husband, Māui told her to call "Moi! Moi!", whereupon Irawaru, in dog form, came running. Hina, in grief, threw herself into the ocean never to be seen again.

Quest for human immortality and death 
After his early exploits, Māui considered himself ready to win immortality for humankind. His father tried to dissuade him, predicting that he will fail because of the mistakes in his baptismal ceremony. His father says to him, "My son, I know that you are a brave fellow and that you have done all things. Yet I am afraid that there is someone who will defeat you."

"Who could that be?" asked Māui.

"Your ancestress Hine-nui-te-pō (Goddess of the Night). You can see her flashing there on the horizon."

"Is she as strong as the sun?" asked Māui. "I trapped him and beat him. Is she greater than the sea, which is greater than the land? Yet I have dragged land from it. Now let us see whether we will find life or death."

His father answered, "You are right, my last-born and the strength of my old age. Go, find your ancestress who lives at the side of the sky."

"What does she look like?" asked Māui.

"The red flashing in the western sky comes from her," said the father. "Her body is like a human being, but her eyes are greenstone, her hair sea-kelp, and her mouth is like a barracouta's mouth."

Māui, undaunted, set out westward, with his companions, to the home of Hine-nui-te-pō. In some versions, his companions are the smallest birds of the forest, the tomtit, the robin, the grey warbler and the fantail. In other versions, his companions are his brothers. He finds Hine asleep with her legs apart, and he and his companions see sharp flints of obsidian and greenstone between her thighs. "Now," Māui tells his friends, "when I go into the body of this old woman, do not laugh at me. Wait until I come out again from her mouth. Then you may laugh as much as you want."

"You will be killed!" was all the companions could say.

"If you laugh I will indeed be killed. But if I pass right through her body I will live, and she will die."

Then he readied himself, winding the cord of his battle club tightly around his wrist and casting aside his garment. As Māui began his task, the cheeks of his watching friends puckered with suppressed laughter. As his head and arms disappear, one of his brothers - or the fantail bird - cannot hold back any longer and burst out in laughter. The old lady wakes, opens her eyes, claps her legs together and cuts Māui in two. Now Māui has become the first being to die and, because he had failed in his task, all human beings are mortal. The goddess keeps her position at the portal to the underworld through which all humans must travel.

Rare or localised legends

Arrival in Bruce Bay 
In south Westland, Kāti Māhaki ki Makaawhio's Te Tauraka Waka a Maui Marae is named in honour of the tradition stating that Māui landed his canoe in Bruce Bay when he arrived in New Zealand.

Creation of Banks Peninsula 
In a tale collected from a Kāi Tahu woman of Lake Ellesmere / Te Waihora, Māui threw a giant to the ocean and then buried him beneath a mountain at Banks Peninsula. The next winter, the giant remained still underneath the mountain, but stirred during summer, which caused the land to split and form Akaroa Harbour. Māui would continue to pile earth on top of the giant, and the giant would continue to stir every summer, creating a lake and Pigeon Bay in the process, until finally the giant could not move anymore.

Māui and Rohe  
In a rare version, a goddess named Rohe was Māui's wife. He mistreated her in a cruel and unusual way. He wished for her to exchange faces with him because she was beautiful and he was not. When she objected, he recited an incantation over her as she slept. When she awoke and realized what had happened, she left the living world and travelled to the underworld where she became a goddess of death.

Origin of eel-like fish 
In one tale, Hina was Māui's wife. Over a period of time where Hina visited a bathing pool, Te Tunaroa, the father of eels, molested her. As revenge, Māui cut Te Tunaroa's body into bits, throwing them into different habitats where they became different kinds of fish; conger eels, freshwater eels, lampreys, and hagfish.

See also 

Māui (Hawaiian mythology)
Maui (Mangarevan mythology)
Maui (Tahitian mythology)
Maui (Tongan mythology)
Ti'iti'i (Samoan mythology)
Whakatau - Another mythical Polynesian (Māori) person with a similar birth to Māui.
Mauisaurus - New Zealand plesiosaur named after Maui.
Maui's Dolphin Endemic dolphin named after Te Ika-a-Māui.

References

Notes

Sources

External links 
 Māui and Hine-nui-te-pō
 Places associated with Māui

Legendary Māori people
New Zealand legends
Maori
Mythological tricksters
Heroes in mythology and legend